Mesotes strigatus, the coastal house snake, is a species of snake in the family Colubridae.  The species is native to Argentina, Uruguay, Paraguay, and Brazil.

References

Mesotes
Snakes of South America
Reptiles of Argentina
Reptiles of Uruguay
Reptiles of Paraguay
Reptiles of Brazil
Reptiles described in 1858
Taxa named by Albert Günther